The Norwegian Medical Society is a medical organisation in Norway.

It has its roots in an informal group created in 1826, which subscribed to and shared foreign medical journals. In 1833 it was formally inaugurated as Lægeforeningen i Christiania, the physician's association in Christiania. The name Norwegian Medical Society was taken in 1847.

From 1826 to 1837 it published Norway's first medical journal, Eyr, named after Eir. From 1840 to 1939 it published the journal Norsk Magazin for Lægevidenskaben, and since 2004 the journal Michael Quarterly. It also hosts symposia and debates.

See also
Norwegian Medical Association

References

Medical associations based in Norway
Organizations established in 1826
Organisations based in Oslo
1826 establishments in Norway